Cystidicoloides is a genus of nematodes belonging to the family Cystidicolidae.

Species:

Cystidicoloides dlouhyi 
Cystidicoloides ephemeridarum 
Cystidicoloides fischeri 
Cystidicoloides tenuissima 
Cystidicoloides truttae 
Cystidicoloides uniseriata 
Cystidicoloides vaucheri

References

Nematodes